Nicklas is a given name and surname. Notable people with the name include the following:

Given name
Niklaus Aeschbacher (1917 – 1995), Swiss composer and conductor
Niklaus Bütler (1786–1854), Swiss painter
Niklaus Dachselhofer (1595 – 1670), Swiss politician
Niklaus Franz von Bachmann (1740 – 1831), Swiss general
Niklaus Friedrich von Steiger (1729 – 1799), Swiss politician
Niklaus Gerber (1850 – 1914), Swiss dairy chemist
Niklaus Grunwald, American biologist and plant pathologist
Niklaus Brantschen (born 1937), Swiss Jesuit, Zen master 
Niklaus Leuenberger (1615 – 1653), Swiss peasant
Niklaus Manuel Deutsch (c. 1484 – 1530), Swiss artist
Niklaus Meienberg (1940 – 1993), Swiss writer and investigative journalist
Niklaus Niggeler (1817 – 1872), Swiss politician
Niklaus Pfluger (born 1958), Swiss Catholic priest
Niklaus Riggenbach (1817 – 1899), Swiss inventor, engineer and locomotive builder
Niklaus Schilling (1944 – 2016), Swiss film director, cinematographer, and screenwriter
Niklaus Schurtenberger (born 1968), Swiss equestrian
Niklaus Stump (1920 – 2005), Swiss cross-country and Nordic combined skier
Niklaus Troxler (born 1947), Swiss graphic designer
Niklaus Weckmann (c. 1481-1526), German sculptor
Niklaus Wirth (born 1934), Swiss computer scientist

Middle name
Franz Niklaus König (1765–1832), Swiss painter

Surname
André Niklaus (born 1981), German decathlete
Stephan Niklaus (born 1958), Swiss decathlete
Mandy Niklaus (born 1956), East German fencer

Fictional characters
Brad Niklaus, Sunset Beach character

See also

Hans Niclaus
Nicklaus (name)
Nikolaus (given name)

Masculine given names
German masculine given names
Swiss masculine given names
Surnames from given names